The Samsung NX1100 is a digital compact camera produced and marketed by Samsung since April 2013 as an entry level camera with interchangeable lenses. It is a 20.3 Megapixel mirrorless interchangeable lens camera using the Samsung NX-mount.

The NX1100 is comparable in weight and size with cameras such as the Sony NEX, Nikon 1 and the Micro Four Thirds series of cameras.

The NX1100 includes the i-Function lens control system and built-in WiFi for connection to online services such as email and social networking. The NX1100 is nearly identical to the NX1000 model.

Camera Gallery

Examples

See also
 Samsung NX series

References

External links 

NX1100
Live-preview digital cameras